Christiansted Harbor Seaplane Base , also known as St. Croix Seaplane Base, is located in the harbor by Christiansted, Saint Croix, U.S. Virgin Islands. This private-use airport is owned by the Virgin Islands Port Authority.

As per Federal Aviation Administration records, this seaplane base had 72,632 passenger boardings (enplanements) in calendar year 2004 and 68,386 enplanements in 2005.

Facilities 
Christiansted Harbor Seaplane Base has one seaplane landing area:
 Runway E/W: , surface: Water

Airlines and destinations

Historically, Virgin Islands Seaplane Shuttle operated scheduled passenger service during the 1980s from the Charlotte Amalie seaplane base with Grumman Mallard aircraft.  These Grumman amphibious aircraft were powered either by piston engines or by turboprop engines via a powerplant conversion program. During the 1970s, Antilles Air Boats operated several different types of seaplanes in scheduled passenger service from the harbor as well including the Consolidated PBY Catalina (Super Catalina version), Grumman Goose, Short Sandringham (S-25) and Vought Sikorsky VS-44, and  Grumman Mallard.

Both Antilles Airboats and The Virgin Islands Seaplane Shuttle flew to St. Thomas, San Juan, and St. John, with Antilles Airboats serving Fajardo.

References

External links 

Airports in the United States Virgin Islands
Seaplane bases in the United States
Saint Croix, U.S. Virgin Islands